Sweet Revenge is a South Korean web series starring Kim Hyang-gi, Lomon and Cha Eun-woo. Produced by Blue Panda Mediatainment and Hidden Sequence, it aired on Oksusu's Fridays at 10:00 (KST) time slot from October 27, 2017, to January 5, 2018, and drew 11 million combined views.

Synopsis
Ho Goo-hee, a high schooler and self-proclaimed pushover, discovers a new application on her phone that offers to take revenge on anyone whose name she writes in it.

Cast

Main
 Kim Hyang-gi as Ho Goo-hee
 Lomon as Shin Ji-hoon
 Kim Hwan-hee as Jung Deok-hee
 Cha Eun-woo as Cha Eun-woo

Supporting

People around Goo-hee
 Park Mi-sun as Goo-hee's mother
 Lee Doo-il as Goo-hee's father
 Ji Gun-woo as Ho Goo-joon, Goo-hee's older brother
 Lee Si-woo as Goo-hee's ex-boyfriend

People around Deok-hee
 Park Kyung-lim as Deok-hee's mother

Students
 Ham Sung-min as Lee Kang-min
 Jo Ah-young as Goo-hee's friend
 Lee Jin-yi as Han Yu-ra
 Kim Hyun-seo as Yang Ah-joon
 Jo Chae-yoon as Yeo Ga-eun
 Lee Eun-saem as Lee So-eun
 Yoo In-soo as Choi Il-jin	
 Cho Yi-hyun as Ye-ri
 Eun Hae-sung
 Oh Yoo-jin
 Mo Nan Hee

Teachers
 Tae In-ho
 Hwang Tae-kwang as M. Choi (the Physical Education teacher)
 Kim San-ho as Eum Chi Hoon, the Music teacher

Special appearances
 Jung Eun-sung
 Astro

Original soundtrack

References

External links
 

Korean-language television shows
2017 South Korean television series debuts
2018 South Korean television series endings
South Korean teen dramas
South Korean high school television series
Television series about revenge
Television series about teenagers
Television series by Hidden Sequence